The Al-Hasa Expedition was an Ottoman military campaign to conquer the El-Hasa region of eastern Arabia. The apparent goal of the campaign was to help Imam Abdullah bin Faisal regain his authority over Najd from his brother Saud bin Faisal, but the real goal was Medhat Pasha's desire to extend the influence of the Ottoman Empire over the Persian Gulf.

Background  
Months after assuming power, Imam Abdullah bin Faisal , on March 29, 1871, sent his messenger Abdul Aziz bin Suwailem to the governor of Baghdad, Medhat Pasha, asking him to help him in the war of his brother Saud bin Faisal, who controlled Al-Ahsa and  Qatif, and snatched it from Imam Abdullah bin Faisal.

Progress of the campaign
The campaign left Basra on April 20, and five infantry columns marched with the cavalry division and artillery under the command of Lieutenant General Naser Pasha, who accompanied the Sheikh of Al-Muntafiq and a group of around 1,000 horsemen from his clan who had volunteered in the campaign, and many recruits joined the campaign Other tribes in Iraq had gathered in the town of Az Zubayr. The commander accompanied Muhammad Saeed Effendi, son of the captain of the supervision in Basra. 

From Kuwait a naval force was added to the campaign, as  the ruler of Kuwait, Sheikh Abdullah II Al-Sabah, supported the campaign with a fleet of eighty ships that he led himself. This fleet reached Ras Tanura on May 13, 1871, at a time when the Ottoman infantry forces were moving across land towards Al-Ahsa. From Ras Tanura, the campaign headed towards Qatif, where it clashed in fierce battles with the followers of Imam Saud bin Faisal, and Qatif fell on June 3, 1871, then the campaign moved towards Dammam and from there to Hofuf.

Outcome
After the city of Al-Ahsa fell in the hands of the Ottomans, Midhat Pasha broke his promise to Imam Abdullah bin Faisal, and the province of Al-Ahsa was separated from the second Saudi state. Al Hasa was reincorporated into the Ottoman Empire and became known as the  Najd Sanjak. Sheikh Abdullah II Al-Sabah  the ruler of Kuwait was granted the honorific title of Kaymakam by the Ottomans for his contribution to the war effort.

References

External links
http://www.muqatel.com/openshare/Mostlhat/Alaam/Mokatel13_1-2.htm_cvt.htm
https://web.archive.org/web/20190501161612/http://aljzl.com/ar/2017/08/01/553/

Bibliography
 Frederick F. Anscombe; Columbia University Columbia University Press (1997). The Ottoman Gulf: The Creation of Kuwait, Saudi Arabia, and Qatar. Columbia University Press. 

Battles of the Wahhabi War

Battles involving the Ottoman Empire

19th century in Saudi Arabia

Battles involving Saudi Arabia

1871 in Asia

1871 in the Ottoman Empire